The Westfalenliga (formerly the ) is the second highest amateur football league in the region of Westphalia which is part of the state of North Rhine-Westphalia and the sixth tier of the German football league system. It operates in two groups which run parallel below the Oberliga Westfalen. Until the introduction of the 3. Liga in 2008 it was the fifth tier of the league system, until the introduction of the Regionalligas in 1994 the fourth tier.

Overview 
The league was formed as a tier-three league under the name Verbandsliga Westfalen in two groups of 16 clubs in 1956 to provide a more streamlined top level for the regional football governing body, the Westphalian Football Association. In earlier years, the Landesliga Westfalen, operated in five groups, was the highest levels of football in the region. The Landesliga still remains as the tier below the Verbandsliga until today.

Despite being operated in two groups, called Nordost or (Gruppe 1) and Südwest or (Gruppe 2), the Verbandsliga Westfalen has to be seen as one league with two regional groups as clubs have been moved frequently between groups, according to geographical needs. The administration and history of the two groups have always been closely tied.

In the early years, the league held a championship series between the two group winners for the title of Westphalian champions at the end of the season. The winner of this series however was not automatically the team promoted to the tier-two 2. Oberliga West. Instead, promotion was determined by a series of games involving the two Verbandsliga Westfalen group winners as well as the champions of the Verbandsliga Niederrhein and Verbandsliga Mittelrhein. This championship series was abandoned after the Oberliga Westfalen was introduced in 1978 as a highest league for the region.

With the introduction of the Bundesliga in 1963, the Verbandsliga came a feeder the also new implemented Regionalliga West but remained, unchanged otherwise, as the third tier of the league system. The same applied when the Regionalliga was replaced by the 2nd Bundesliga Nord in 1974. The league champions however now had to gain promotion through a play-off system with the winners of the other tier-three leagues in northern Germany.

In 1978, the Amateur-Oberliga Westfalen was formed as the third tier of football in Westfalen. One of the main reasons for this move was to provide direct promotion for the tier-three champions again. The clubs placed one to nine in each Verbandsliga group were admitted to the new Oberliga. The Verbandsliga became the feeder league for the new Oberliga, but now as a tier-four competition. Both champions, and some years one or both runners-up, were directly promoted to Oberliga. With the re-introduction of the Regionalligen in 1994, the league slipped to tier-five but remained unchanged otherwise.

In 2008, with the introduction of the 3. Liga, the Verbandsliga was downgraded to the sixth tier. Also, the league now became a feeder to the new founded NRW-Liga, a merger of the Oberliga Nordrhein and the Oberliga Westfalen. The champions of both Verbandsliga groups were still directly promoted. Promotions for the runners-up was abolished due to the merger. The league also changed their name to Westfalenliga.

In 2012 the Oberliga Westfalen was reintroduced as the league above the Westfalenliga, replacing the NRW-Liga again. The number of Landesligas below the Westfalenliga was also reduced from five to four.

League champions
From 1957 to 1978 a championship decider was played to determine the Westfalen champion, usually played on home-and-away base with a third game if necessary. Some seasons however, there was only one game, on neutral ground and in 1966 and 1968 no games were played.

 Promoted teams in bold.
 In 1965, VfL Bochum won by coin flip.
 In 1966 and 1968, no champion was determined; in 1967 the contest was drawn.
 In 1969, SpVgg Erkenschwick, runners-up of Group 1, was also promoted.

With the introduction of the Oberliga Westfalen in 1978, the winner of this league was the official champion of Westfalen, deciders between the two Verbandsliga champions were therefore unnecessary. League winners were automatically promoted, some seasons the runners-up too.

 In 2006, DSC Wanne-Eickel was refused promotion.
 In 2012, because of the recreation of the Oberliga Westfalen, Hammer SpVgg, FC Gütersloh 2000, SC Roland Beckum, 1. FC Gievenbeck, SuS Neuenkirchen, SpVgg Erkenschwick, TuS Heven, TuS Ennepetal and TSG Sprockhövel were also promoted.
 In 2021, the season curtailed and annulled during the COVID-19 pandemic in Germany.

References

Sources 
 Deutschlands Fußball in Zahlen,  An annual publication with tables and results from the Bundesliga to Verbandsliga/Landesliga, publisher: DSFS
 Kicker Almanach,  The yearbook on German football from Bundesliga to Oberliga, since 1937, published by the Kicker Sports Magazine
 Die Deutsche Liga-Chronik 1945-2005  History of German football from 1945 to 2005 in tables, publisher: DSFS, published: 2006

External links 
 Das deutsche Fussball Archiv  Historic German league tables
 Westfalen Football Association (FLVW) 

Verbandsliga
Football competitions in North Rhine-Westphalia
1956 establishments in Germany
Sports leagues established in 1956